Oncidium graminifolium is a species of orchid occurring from Mexico to Central America.

graminifolium
Orchids of Central America
Orchids of Mexico